Otto von Seydewitz (born September 11 1818 in Großbadegast; died November 12 1898 in Biesig, near Reichenbach) was a German landowner and politician for German Conservative Party.

Life 
His father was Kurt von Seydewitz (1780–1853). He studied German law in Berlin and was member of Reichstag of North German Confederation and German Reichstag until 1884.
From 21 May 1879 to 1880 Seydewitz was for a short time president of German Reichstag.

Literature over Seydewitz 
 Rainer Paetau (ed.): Die Protokolle des Preußischen Staatsministeriums 1817–1934/38. Bd. 5. In: Berlin-Brandenburgische Akademie der Wissenschaften (Hrsg.): Acta Borussica. Neue Folge. Olms-Weidmann, Hildesheim 2004, ISBN 3-487-11002-4, p. 391 (

References

External links 

 

Prussian politicians
German Conservative Party politicians
Members of the Prussian House of Lords
Members of the 1st Reichstag of the German Empire
Members of the 2nd Reichstag of the German Empire
Members of the 3rd Reichstag of the German Empire
Members of the 4th Reichstag of the German Empire
Members of the 5th Reichstag of the German Empire
1818 births
1898 deaths